Tullychurry (IPA:[ˈt̪ˠʊliːˈxʊɾˠɾˠiː]) is a townland of 521  acres in County Fermanagh, Northern Ireland. It is situated in the civil parish of Belleek and the historic barony of Lurg.

Places of interest
Tullychurry Forest is open to the public and covers 830 hectares of coniferous woodland with large areas unplanted for conservation purposes. It is also a designated forest for horse riding.

See also
List of townlands in County Fermanagh

References 

Townlands of County Fermanagh
Civil parish of Belleek